Robert James "Roy" Crawford  ( – 23 June 2016) was a university administrator and mechanical engineering academic, whose primary research interest has been in the mechanical properties and processing behaviour of plastics.

From 1989 to 1999, he was Professor of Mechanical Engineering and Director of the School of Mechanical and Process Engineering at the Queen's University Belfast in Northern Ireland. He was also responsible for establishing the Polymer Processing Research Centre at Queen's University. This centre included the Research Group on rotational moulding of plastics, which he also established. From 1999 to 2001, he was Professor of Mechanical Engineering at the University of Auckland in New Zealand.

From 2001 to 2004, Crawford was Pro Vice-Chancellor for Research at Queen's University Belfast. From January 2005 until December 2014, he was Vice Chancellor of the University of Waikato in New Zealand.

Crawford published nine books and about 300 papers, and was a member of numerous government panels and research grant committees in the United Kingdom. He was an expert in the rotational moulding of plastics, and gave keynote lectures, courses and seminars on this subject all over the world. During his tenure at Queen's in the 1990s, his school improved its rating in the RAE (Research Assessment Exercise) from Grade 3 in the 1992 RAE to the top Grade of 5* in 1996. He was a member of the 2001 RAE Panel for assessing Mechanical Engineering in all universities in the United Kingdom.

Crawford was born in Northern Ireland, and gained a BSc, PhD and DSc from Queen's University. In 1998, he was elected as a Fellow of the Royal Academy of Engineering, and in 2005 he was elected as a Fellow of the Society of Plastics Engineers. Only 227 Fellows have been elected worldwide to this Society since it was established in 1946. In the 2015 Queen's Birthday Honours, Crawford was appointed a Companion of the New Zealand Order of Merit, for services to tertiary education.

A British national and permanent resident of New Zealand, Crawford was married with three children. He died on 23 June 2016, aged 67 years.

References

1940s births
2016 deaths
British mechanical engineers
Alumni of Queen's University Belfast
Academics of Queen's University Belfast
Fellows of the Royal Academy of Engineering
Academic staff of the University of Auckland
Year of birth missing
Academic staff of the University of Waikato
Companions of the New Zealand Order of Merit